Megadontognathus is a genus of ghost knifefishes found in river rapids in tropical South America.

Species
There are currently two described species in this genus:

 Megadontognathus cuyuniense Mago-Leccia, 1994
 Megadontognathus kaitukaensis Campos-da-Paz, 1999

References

Apteronotidae
Fish of South America
Freshwater fish genera
Taxa named by Francisco Mago Leccia